Materials Research Corporation (MRC) was a global manufacturer and supplier of highly specialized semiconductor materials and equipment.

Timeline

1957: Materials Research Corporation founded by Dr. Sheldon Weinig 47 Buena Vista Ave., Yonkers, NY
for the purification and characterization of materials to be used in controlled research
1970: IPO, listed on the American Stock Exchange. Businesses included sputtering systems, high purity materials for sputtering and evaporation thin film metal processes, ultra high purity fine grande alumina substrates for telecommunication devices.
1975: Introduced 902/903 Batch
1980: Introduced 603 Batch
1981: Moved company from Yonkers , New York to Route 303, Orangeburg, NY  10962
1988: Introduced the Eclipse 
1989: MRC acquires CVD division in Phoenix, AZ
1989: Acquired by Sony Corporation of America (for $58 million) 
1992: Garrett Pierce becomes President and CEO
1993: Tom Marmen becomes President and CEO
1996: Dr. Robert Foster becomes CEO
1997: Moved operations from NY to Gilbert, AZ, as part of a company reorganization
Outsourced manufacturing of the Eclipse Mark II, Eclipse Star, and Solaces PVD to Derlan, Inc.
Veeco Instruments Inc., Plainview, N.Y. acquired MRC Media & Magnetics Applications (MMA) division  in Orangeburg, N.Y
1998: Tokyo Electron Limited (TEL) acquired the equipment divisions of MRC
KDF acquired the MRC batch and etch product lines from Tokyo Electron
1999: Praxair Surface Technologies, Inc., a wholly owned subsidiary of Praxair, Inc. acquired the business of Materials Research Corporation (MRC), a wholly owned subsidiary of Sony Corporation of America.

References

Equipment semiconductor companies